The Filmfare Best Film Award is given by the Filmfare magazine as part of its annual Filmfare Awards South for Tamil (Kollywood) films.

Winners

Nominations

1970s
1972 – Pattikada Pattanama
1973 – Bharatha Vilas
1974 – Dikkatra Parvathi
 Aval Oru Thodar Kathai
 Urimai Kural
1975 – Apoorva Raagangal
 Anbe Aaruyire
 Idhayakkani
1976 – Annakili
 Chitra Pournami
 Moondru Mudichu
 Oru Oodhappu Kan Simittugiradhu
 Thunive Thunai
1977 – Bhuvana Oru Kelvi Kuri
 16 Vayathinile
 Aattukara Alamelu
 Avargal
 Sila Nerangalil Sila Manithargal
1978 – Mullum Malarum
 Aval Appadithan
 Ilamai Oonjal Aadukirathu
 Kizhakke Pogum Rail
 Sigappu Rojakkal
1979 – Pasi
 Azhiyatha Kolangal
 Ninaithale Inikkum
 Puthiya Vaarpugal
 Uthiri Pookkal

1980s
1980 – Varumayin Niram Sigappu
 Billa
 Jhonny
 Nenjathai Killathe
 Vandichakkaram
1981 – Thaneer Thaneer
 Alaigal Oivathillai
 Andha 7 Naatkal
 Panneer Pushpangal
 Thillu Mullu
1982 – Enkeyo Ketta Kural
 Agni Sakshi
 Gopurangal Saivathillai
 Moondram Pirai
 Payanangal Mudivathillai
1983 – Man Vasanai
 Mundhanai Mudichu
 Oru Odai Nadhiyagirathu
 Thangaikkor Geetham
 Vellai Roja
1984 – Achamillai Achamillai
 Nallavanukku Nallavan
 Nooravathu Naal
 Pudhumai Penn
 Sirai
1985 – Sindhu Bhairavi
 Chinna Veedu
 Muthal Mariyathai
 Oru Kaidhiyin Diary
 Poove Poochudava
1986 – Samsaram Adhu Minsaram
 Amman Kovil Kizhakale
 Kadalora Kavithaigal
 Mouna Ragam
 Punnagai Mannan
1987 – Vedham Pudhithu
 Enga Chinna Rasa
 Nayakan
 Neethikku Thandanai
 Rettai Vaal Kuruvi
1988 – Agni Natchathiram
 En Bommukutty Ammavukku
 Sathya
 Unnal Mudiyum Thambi
 Veedu
1989 – Apoorva Sagodharargal
 Aararo Aariraro
 Pudhea Paadhai
 Pudhu Pudhu Arthangal
 Varusham Padhinaaru

1990s
1990 – Pudhu Vasantham
 Anjali
 En Uyir Thozhan
 Keladi Kanmani
 Kizhakku Vaasal
 Michael Madana Kama Rajan
1991 – Chinna Thambi
 Azhagan
 En Rasavin Manasile
 Gunaa
 Thalapathi
1992 – Roja
 Annamalai
 Chinna Gounder
 Thevar Magan
 Vaaname Ellai
1993 – Gentleman
 Gokulam
 Jathi Malli
 Kizhakku Cheemayile
 Marupadiyum
1994 – Karuthamma
 Kadhalan
 Mahanadhi
 Magalir Mattum
 Nattamai
1995 – Bombay
 Avatharam
 Indira
 Kolangal
 Sathi Leelavathi
1996 – Indian
 Anthimanthaarai
 Kadhal Desam
 Kadhal Kottai
 Kalki
1997 – Bharathi Kannamma
 Iruvar
 Minsara Kanavu
 Porkkalam
 Suryavamsam
1998 – Natpukkaga
 Desiya Geetham
 Jeans
 Maru Malarchi
 Unnidathil Ennai Koduthen
1999 – Sethu
 Housefull
 Mudhalvan
 Padayappa
 Thulladha Manamum Thullum

2000s
2000 – Kandukondain Kandukondain
 Alaipayuthey
 Hey Ram
 Kushi
 Mugavaree
 Vaanathaipola
2001 – Aanandham
 Friends
 Kasi
2002 – Azhagi
 Kannathil Muthamittal
 Panchatanthiram
 Ramanaa
 Unnai Ninaithu
2003 – Pithamagan
 Anbe Sivam
 Dhool
 Kaakha Kaakha
 Kadhal Kondein
 Saamy
2004 – Autograph
 Aayutha Ezhuthu
 Ghilli
 Kaadhal
 M. Kumaran S/O Mahalakshmi
2005 – Anniyan
 Ayya
 Chandramukhi
 Ghajini
 Thavamai Thavamirundhu
2006 – Veyyil
 Chithiram Pesuthadi
 E
 Em Magan
 Thiruttu Payale
2007 – Paruthiveeran
 Billa
 Mozhi
 Pokkiri
 Sivaji
2008 – Subramaniyapuram
 Anjathe
 Dasavathaaram
 Santosh Subramaniam
 Vaaranam Aayiram
 Yaaradi Nee Mohini
2009 – Naadodigal
 Ayan
 Kanchivaram
 Naan Kadavul
 Pasanga
 Peranmai

2010s
2010 – Mynaa
 Aayirathil Oruvan
 Angadi Theru
 Enthiran
 Madrasapattinam
 Vinnaithaandi Varuvaayaa
2011 – Aadukalam
 7aum Arivu
 Deiva Thirumagal
 Ko
 Mankatha
2012 – Vazhakku Enn 18/9
 Kumki
 Neerparavai
 Sundarapandian
 Thuppakki
2013 – Thanga Meengal
 Haridas
 Paradesi
 Singam 2
 Thalaimuraigal
 Vishwaroopam
2014 – Kaththi 
 Kaaviya Thalaivan
 Madras
 Mundasupatti
 Velaiyilla Pattathari
 2015 – Kaaka Muttai
 36 Vayathinile
 I
 OK Kanmani
 Papanasam
 Thani Oruvan 
 2016 – Joker
 Achcham Yenbadhu Madamaiyada
 Irudhi Suttru
 Kabali
 Theri
 Visaranai
 2017 – Aramm
 Aruvi
 Taramani
 Theeran Adhigaram Ondru
 Vikram Vedha
 2018 – Pariyerum Perumal
 96
 Chekka Chivantha Vaanam
 Ratsasan
 Sarkar
 Vada Chennai
 2020-2021 – Jai Bhim 
Ka Pae Ranasingam 
Kannum Kannum Kollaiyadithaal 
Karnan 
Mandela 
Sarpatta Parambarai 
Soorarai Potru

References

Sources

External links
52nd Annual Awards

Filmfare Awards South (Tamil)
Awards for best film